IFC Wild Bills were a football club from the Northern Mariana Islands. They have won 2 titles in M*League in 2012 and 2013 spring.

Achievements
M*League champions
 2012, 2013

References

Football clubs in the Northern Mariana Islands